Zea italica is a putative species of medicinal grass, allegedly native to tropical America. Zea italica is marketed as a homeopathic remedy, supposedly for the conditions named "chronic malaria", "chronic gonorrhoea", "chronic prostatitis", and "chronic dropsy".

In the pseudoscientific homeopathic belief system, Zea Italica possesses curative properties in skin diseases, particularly in psoriasis and eczema rubrum.

Some invented phrases associated with the term Zea italica are "Mania for bathing. Impulse to suicide, particularly by drowning. Easily angered. Appetite increased, voracious, alternating with disgust for food".

References

italica